The 1958 season was the 2nd season of the Liga Española de Baloncesto. Real Madrid won their title.

Teams

Venues and locations

League table

Relegation playoffs

|}

Individual statistics

Points

External links

ACB.com 
linguasport 

1957
1958 in basketball
1957–58 in Spanish basketball